This is a list of museums in Palau.

 Belau National Museum
 Etpison Museum

See also 
 List of museums

External links 
 Institutions in Palau

 
Palau
Palau

Museums
museums